The 2003 OFC Women's Championship was held in Canberra, Australia from 5 to 13 April 2003. It was the seventh staging of the OFC Women's Championship.

Originally scheduled for 19–29 November 2002, the tournament was postponed after withdrawal by American Samoa, Tahiti and Tonga. A rescheduled tournament with seven teams in two groups was arranged, however Fiji and Vanuatu withdrew, resulting in a five nation championship of one group.

The tournament served as the OFC's qualifying tournament for the FIFA Women's World Cup 2003. OFC's one berth was given to the winner – Australia.

Participating nations
Of the twelve nations affiliated to the Oceania Football Confederation, five entered the tournament. Also, this was Australia's last appearance in the tournament before moving to the Asian Football Confederation in 2006.

Officials
4 referees were named for the tournament:
 Tammy Ogston
 Krystyna Szokolai
 Rajendra Singh
 Joakim Salaiau Sosongan

Results

Awards

Goalscorers
10 goals
 Maia Jackman
8 goals
 April Mann
7 goals
 Nicky Smith
6 goals

 Kelly Golebiowski
 Joanne Peters

5 goals
 Simone Ferrara
4 goals

 Heather Garriock
 Danielle Small

3 goals

 Dianne Alagich
 Lydia Banabas

2 goals

 Hayley Crawford
 Rhian Davies
 Tal Karp
 Cheryl Salisbury
 Thea Slatyer
 Amy Wilson
 Michele Keinzley
 Neilen Limbai
 Glenda Matthies

1 goal

 Olivia Hohnke
 Sacha Wainwright
 Melanie Rakei
 Priscilla Duncan
 Wendi Henderson
 Terry McCahill
 Hayley Moorwood
 Jane Simpson
 Priscilla Konalalai
 Miriam Lanta
 Nakere Nombe
 Lynette Laumea
 Selesitina Peresia
 Leti Tarai

References

Women's Championship
OFC Women's Nations Cup tournaments
2003 FIFA Women's World Cup qualification
International women's association football competitions hosted by Australia
Ofc Women's Championship, 2003
2003 in New Zealand association football